Decticoides brevipennis, the Wello-bush cricket, is a species of grasshopper in the family Tettigoniidae. It is a pest of teff in Africa.

References

Tettigoniidae
Insect pests of millets